EPC was the third EP released by the experimental rock band Battles. It was released by Dotlinecircle in 2004. In Japan, this EP was well received critically and is the only EP by Battles (whose name is rendered on the front cover in katakana, バトルス, Batorusu) to be released in Japan alone.

Track listing

Personnel
Battles – artwork, mixing, concept
Tyondai Braxton – guitar, keyboards
Emery Dobyns – engineer, mixing
Jason Fulford – cover photo
Tom Hutten – mastering
David Konopka – guitar
John Stanier – drums
Ian Williams – guitar, keyboards

2004 EPs
Battles (band) EPs